Belcalis Marlenis Almánzar Cephus (born October 11, 1992), known professionally as Cardi B, is an American rapper.  She first gained popularity as an influencer on Vine and Instagram. From 2015 to early 2017, she appeared as a regular cast member on the VH1 reality television series Love & Hip Hop: New York, which depicted her pursuit of her music aspirations, and earned further recognition with the release of her two mixtapes: Gangsta Bitch Music, Vol. 1 (2016) and Vol. 2 (2017).

Cardi B's first studio album, Invasion of Privacy (2018), debuted at number one on the U.S. Billboard 200 With the album receiving critical acclaim, it made her the first and only woman to win the Grammy Award for Best Rap Album as a solo artist, and marked the second female rap album nominated for Album of the Year. It spawned two number-one singles on the U.S. Billboard Hot 100 the lead single, "Bodak Yellow" made her become the second female rapper to top the Hot 100 with a solo song and the first to achieve a diamond-certified song by the RIAA. The fourth single, "I Like It" (with Bad Bunny and J Balvin), marked the first time a female rapper attained multiple number-one songs on the Hot 100. Her third Hot 100 number-one was her feature on "Girls Like You" by pop rock band Maroon 5. It made her the only female rapper to achieve multiple diamond-certified songs by the RIAA.

She has since released three singles from her upcoming second studio album — 2020's "WAP" (featuring Megan Thee Stallion), 2021's "Up", and 2022's "Hot Shit" (featuring Kanye West and Lil Durk), with the first two topping the Hot 100 and other charts worldwide. She holds various records among female rappers as she has the most number-one singles (five) on the Billboard Hot 100 and was the first and only female rapper to have multiple solo number ones.  Additionally, she has the most songs with a billion streams on Spotify for a female rapper.

Her accolades include a Grammy Award, eight Billboard Music Awards, six Guinness World Records, six American Music Awards, 14 BET Hip Hop Awards, and two ASCAP Songwriter of the Year awards. In 2018, Time magazine included her on its annual list of the 100 most influential people in the world, and in 2020, Billboard honored her as Woman of the Year. Outside of music, she became the creative director of entertainment magazine Playboy in 2022.

Early life
Belcalis Marlenis Almánzar was born in Washington Heights, Manhattan, on October 11, 1992. She has a Dominican father and a Trinidadian mother of African and Spanish descent. Almánzar was raised in the Highbridge neighborhood of the South Bronx, and spent much time at her paternal grandmother's home in Washington Heights, which she credits with giving her "such a thick accent." Almánzar developed the stage name "Cardi B" as a derivation of Bacardi, a rum brand that was formerly her nickname. She has a younger sister, Hennessy Carolina, who was born in 1995. She has said she was a gang member with the Bloods in her youth, since age 16, but stated she would not encourage joining a gang. She attended Renaissance High School for Musical Theater & Technology, a vocational high school on the Herbert H. Lehman High School campus.

During her teens, Cardi B was employed at an Amish deli in Tribeca. She was fired and became a dancer at a strip club across the street. Cardi B has said that becoming a stripper was positive for her life in many ways: "It really saved me from a lot of things. When I started stripping I went back to school." She stated that she became a stripper to escape poverty and domestic violence, having been in an abusive relationship at the time after being kicked out of her mother's house, and that stripping was her only way to earn enough money to escape the situation and get an education. She attended Borough of Manhattan Community College before eventually dropping out. While stripping, Cardi B lied to her mother by telling her she was making money by babysitting.

In 2013, she began to gain publicity due to several of her videos spreading on social media, on Vine and her Instagram page.

Career

2015–2016: Career beginnings 

In 2015, Cardi B joined the cast of the VH1 reality television series Love & Hip Hop: New York, debuting in season six. Jezebel considered her the breakout star of the show's sixth season. The New York Times wrote that she garnered popularity with "her ability to rattle off one-liners". The sixth and seventh seasons chronicle her rise to stardom and her turbulent relationship with her incarcerated fiancé. On December 30, 2016, after two seasons, she announced that she would be leaving the show to further pursue a career in music.

In November 2015, Cardi B made her musical debut on Jamaican reggae fusion singer Shaggy's remix to his single "Boom Boom", alongside fellow Jamaican dancehall singer Popcaan. She made her music video debut on December 15, 2015, with the song "Cheap Ass Weave", her rendition of British rapper Lady Leshurr's "Queen's Speech 4". On March 7, 2016, Cardi B released her first full-length project, a mixtape titled Gangsta Bitch Music, Vol. 1. In November 2016, she was featured on the digital cover of Vibe magazines "Viva" issue.

On September 12, 2016, KSR Group released the compilation Underestimated: The Album, which is a collaboration between KSR Group artists Cardi B, HoodCelebrityy, SwiftOnDemand, Cashflow Harlem, and Josh X. It was previously released only to attendees of their U.S. tour. KSR Group's flagship artist Cardi B said "I wanted to make a song that would make girls dance, twerk and at the same time encourage them to go get that Shmoney," in regard to the compilation's single "What a Girl Likes".

She appeared on the December 9, 2015, episode of Uncommon Sense with Charlamagne. On April 6, 2016, she was on the twelfth episode of Khloé Kardashian's Kocktails with Khloé: in this episode, she revealed how she told her mother that she was a stripper. In November 2016, it was announced that she would be joining the cast of the BET series Being Mary Jane. TVLine describes her character, Mercedes, as a "round-the-way beauty with a big weave, big boobs and a big booty to match her oversize, ratchet personality."

In 2016, Cardi B was featured in her first endorsement deal with Romantic Depot, a large New York chain of lingerie stores that sell sexual health and wellness products. The ad campaign was featured on radio and cable TV.

2017–2018: Breakthrough with Invasion of Privacy 

On January 20, 2017, Cardi B released her second mixtape, Gangsta Bitch Music, Vol. 2. In February 2017, Cardi B partnered with MAC Cosmetics and Rio Uribe's Gypsy Sport for an event for New York Fashion Week. In late February, Cardi B signed her first major record label recording contract with Atlantic Records. On February 25, 2017, Cardi B was the opening act for East Coast hip hop group The Lox's Filthy America... It's Beautiful Tour, alongside fellow New York City-based rappers Lil' Kim and Remy Ma. In April 2017, she was featured in i-D "A-Z of Music" video sponsored by Marc Jacobs. Cardi guest-starred on the celebrity panel show Hip Hop Squares, appearing on the March 13 and April 3, 2017, episodes. She also released the freestyle "Red Barz".

In May 2017, the nominees for the 2017 BET Awards were announced, revealing that Cardi B had been nominated for Best New Artist and Best Female Hip-Hop Artist. Although Chance the Rapper and Remy Ma won those categories, respectively, Cardi B performed at the BET Awards Afterparty show. On June 11, 2017, during Hot 97's annual Summer Jam music festival, Remy Ma brought out Cardi B, along with The Lady of Rage, MC Lyte, Young M.A, Monie Love, Lil' Kim, and Queen Latifah, to celebrate female rappers and perform Latifah's 1993 hit single "U.N.I.T.Y." about female empowerment. In June 2017, it was revealed that Cardi B would be on the cover of The Faders Summer Music issue for July/August 2017. She performed at MoMA PS1 on August 19 to a crowd of 4,000.

On June 16, 2017, Atlantic Records released Cardi B's commercial debut single, "Bodak Yellow", via digital distribution. She performed the single on The Wendy Williams Show and Jimmy Kimmel Live! The song climbed the charts for several months, and, on the Billboard Hot 100 chart dated September 25, 2017, "Bodak Yellow" reached the number one spot, making Cardi B the first female rapper to do so with a solo single since Lauryn Hill's "Doo Wop (That Thing)" debuted atop the chart in 1998. The song stayed atop the charts for three consecutive weeks, tying with American pop singer Taylor Swift's "Look What You Made Me Do" as the longest running female at the number one spot in 2017.

Cardi B became the first person of Dominican descent to reach number one in the history of the Hot 100 since it was launched in 1958. An editor of The New York Times called it "the rap anthem of the summer". Selected by The Washington Post and Pitchfork music critics as the best song of 2017, "Bodak Yellow" was eventually certified Diamond by the Recording Industry Association of America (RIAA). The song received nominations for Best Rap Performance and Best Rap Song at the 60th Grammy Awards. It won Single of the Year at the 2017 BET Hip Hop Awards.

With her collaborations "No Limit" and "MotorSport", she became the first female rapper to land her first three entries in the top 10 of the Hot 100, and the first female artist to achieve the same on the Hot R&B/Hip-Hop Songs chart. In October 2017, Cardi B headlined Power 105.1's annual Powerhouse music celebration, alongside the Weeknd, Migos, and Lil Uzi Vert, at the Barclays Center in Brooklyn, New York. In December, she released two songs: a collaboration with Puerto Rican singer Ozuna titled "La Modelo", and "Bartier Cardi", the second single from her debut album.

On January 3, 2018, Cardi B was featured on Bruno Mars' remix version of "Finesse", and appeared in the 90s inspired video. It reached the top three on the Hot 100, Canada and New Zealand. On January 18, 2018, Cardi B became the first woman to have five top 10 singles simultaneously on the Billboard Hot R&B/Hip-Hop Songs chart. She released another single, "Be Careful", on March 30, 2018, a week before her album's release.

Her debut studio album, Invasion of Privacy, was released on April 6, 2018, to universal acclaim from music critics. Editors from Variety and The New York Times called it "one of the most powerful debuts of this millennium" and "a hip-hop album that doesn't sound like any of its temporal peers," respectively. The album entered at number one in the United States, while she became the first female artist to chart 13 entries simultaneously on the Billboard Hot 100, on the chart issue dated April 21. It became the most streamed album by a female artist in a single week in Apple Music, and the largest on-demand audio streaming week ever for an album by a woman. Cardi held the latter record until 2019. The album's title reflects Cardi B's feeling that as she gained popularity her privacy was being invaded in a variety of ways. Following the album's release, during a performance on Saturday Night Live, Cardi B officially announced her pregnancy, after much media speculation. She also co-hosted an episode of The Tonight Show Starring Jimmy Fallon.

Several months later, in July 2018, the album's fourth single, "I Like It", which features vocals from Bad Bunny and J Balvin, reached number one on the Hot 100; this marked her second number one on the chart and made her the first female rapper to achieve multiple chart-toppers. It received critical acclaim, with Rolling Stone naming it "the best summer song of all time" in 2020. Her collaboration with Maroon 5, "Girls Like You", also reached number one on the Hot 100 chart, extending her record among female rappers and also making her the sixth female artist to achieve three number-one singles on the chart during the 2010s. The song's music video has received more than 3 billion views on YouTube and was the fifth-best selling song of the year globally.

With "Girls Like You" following "I Like It" at the top of the Billboard Radio Songs chart, Cardi B became the first female rapper to ever replace herself at number one on that chart. The single spent seven weeks atop the Hot 100, making Cardi the female rapper with the most cumulative weeks atop the chart, with eleven weeks. It spent 33 weeks in the top 10, tying both Ed Sheeran's "Shape of You" and Post Malone and Swae Lee's "Sunflower" for the longest top 10 run in the chart's archives at the time. In October 2018, Invasion of Privacy was certified double platinum by the RIAA, and the following year it was updated to triple platinum. With the thirteen tracks, she became the first female artist to have all songs from an album certified gold or higher in the US.

Cardi B received the most nominations for the 2018 MTV Video Music Awards with 12 mentions—including for Video of the Year, winning three awards. She tied with Drake for the most nominations at the 2018 American Music Awards. She won three AMAs and performed at the ceremony. Her single "Money" earned her a fourth Video Music Award, with visuals that feature Cardi playing characters in different locations, including in an art museum, a bank and a strip club. Her collaboration with DJ Snake "Taki Taki" topped the charts in a number of Hispanic countries, made Cardi B the first female rapper to top the Spotify Global 50 chart, and has garnered more than 2 billion views. Both singles were certified multiple-platinum by the RIAA. People en Español named her Star of the Year, and Entertainment Weekly deemed her "a pop culture phenomenon", as she was named one of "2018 Entertainers of the Year".

On November 30, 2018, Cardi B was honored at Ebonys annual Power 100 Gala. Cardi ranked fifth on the 2018 Billboard Year-End Top Artists chart, while Invasion of Privacy ranked sixth. She achieved the most-streamed album of the year by a female artist globally in Apple Music, and ranked as the most streamed female artist of the year in the United States in Spotify. Editorial staff from Apple Music and Billboard named "I Like It" the best song of 2018, while Time magazine and Rolling Stone named Invasion of Privacy the best album of the year. Also in 2018, Time included her on their annual list of the 100 most influential people in the world. In its decade-end review article, NME stated that the era secured "her crown as the new Queen of Rap."

2019–present: Hustlers, Rhythm + Flow and upcoming second studio album

Cardi B received five nominations at the 61st Grammy Awards, including for Album of the Year, Best Rap Album and Record of the Year ("I Like It"). She became the third female rapper to be nominated for Album of the Year, following Lauryn Hill (1999) and Missy Elliott (2004). On February 10, 2019, she then performed at the award ceremony, where she wore three vintage Thierry Mugler couture looks during the telecast and became the first female rapper to win Best Rap Album as a solo artist.

Cardi B led the 2019 Billboard Music Awards nominations, with 21, the most nominations in a single year ever by a woman and the third most nominations in a year ever (behind Drake and The Chainsmokers, who both had 22 in a year). She ended up winning six awards, including for Top Hot 100 Song, bringing her career total wins to seven—the most of any female rapper in history. An article by Omaha World-Herald called her "the biggest rapper in the world."

On February 15, 2019, Cardi B released "Please Me", a collaboration with Bruno Mars, which became her seventh top-ten song on the Hot 100, reaching number three. The song marked Cardi and Bruno's second collaboration, following "Finesse" in 2018. The official music video was released two weeks later. On March 1, Cardi set a new attendance record at the Houston Livestock Show and Rodeo, with 75,580 fans in the audience. With "Backin' It Up", "Twerk" and "Money", Cardi became the first female artist to occupy the top three on the Billboard Mainstream R&B/Hip-Hop airplay chart.

Her following single titled "Press" was released on May 31, 2019. The parental-advisory labeled music video marked her directorial debut—being credited as co-director, and was released on June 26, 2019. It had its debut performance at the 2019 BET Awards, where she received the most nominations with seven, and won Album of the Year. During the summer of 2019, she embarked on an arena tour. In September, she led the BET Hip Hop Awards nominations with ten.

Cardi B made her film debut in Hustlers directed by Lorene Scafaria, opposite Jennifer Lopez, Constance Wu, and Lili Reinhart. The film was released on September 13, 2019. Cardi B, along with Chance the Rapper and T.I., were confirmed as judges for the Netflix series Rhythm + Flow, a ten-part hip-hop talent search that premiered on October 9, 2019, which she also executive produced.

In December 2019, Cardi B embarked on her first tour of Africa, performing in Nigeria and Ghana. Her collaboration "Clout" was nominated for a Grammy Award for Best Rap Performance. She was the most streamed female rapper of 2019 in the US, according to Spotify. Consequence of Sound deemed her "one of the most formidable hip-hop artists of the decade." In March 2020, Cardi B created a reaction video about the coronavirus pandemic. DJ iMarkkeyz, a Brooklyn DJ known for turning memes and online moments into full-length songs, created a track, based on her reaction titled "Coronavirus", which became an internet meme and was released to music platforms. Netflix announced the return of Rhythm + Flow for 2021.

Cardi B released the single "WAP" featuring American rapper Megan Thee Stallion on August 7, 2020, as the lead single off her forthcoming second studio album. The song received critical acclaim and was praised for its sex positive messages. The Colin Tilley-directed music video accompanied the song itself, and broke the record for the biggest 24-hour debut for an all-female collaboration on YouTube. She became the only female rap artist to top the Global Spotify chart multiple times. "WAP" debuted at number-one on the Billboard Hot 100 chart, garnering Cardi B her fourth chart-topper in the US, extending her record as the female rapper with the most number-one singles, and also making her the first female rapper to achieve Hot 100 number one singles in two different decades (2010s and 2020s).

With 93 million streaming units, it became the largest first-week streams for a song, breaking the all-time record held by Ariana Grande's "7 Rings". It has spent four weeks atop the Hot 100. The single has also spent multiple weeks at number one in seven other countries, including Australia and the United Kingdom. Neil Shah of The Wall Street Journal deemed it "a big moment for female rappers" and "a historic sign that women artists are making their mark on hip-hop like never before". "WAP" became the first number one single on the inaugural Billboard Global 200 chart.

It became critics' best song of the year according to a compilation of rankings made by the BBC, with publications such as Pitchfork and Rolling Stone placing it at number one. Cardi B won the Billboard Music Award for Top Rap Female Artist for the third time at the 2020 ceremony. In December 2020, Cardi B became the first female rapper to be named Woman of the Year at the Billboard Women in Music Awards. With her win for "WAP" at the American Music Awards, she became the first artist to win the American Music Award for Favorite Rap/Hip-Hop Song multiple times, following her win for "Bodak Yellow" in 2018.

On February 5, 2021, Cardi B released "Up", the second single from her upcoming studio album. A music video for the single was released alongside it. The song was praised by NME magazine for its lyricism and fresh approach as a successor to "WAP". "Up" debuted at number two on the US Billboard Hot 100 chart, marking the highest debut for a solo female rap song since Lauryn Hill's "Doo Wop (That Thing)" in 1998. The song debuted at number one on the Rolling Stone Top 100, becoming both Cardi B's second number-one single and second number-one debut, as well as the first time a female rapper debuts atop the chart with a solo song.

Cardi B became the first female artist and first lead artist with consecutive number-one debuts on the US Hot R&B/Hip-Hop Songs chart, and second overall performer following Drake in 2016. "Up" reached number one on the Billboard Hot 100 after her Grammy Awards performance, making Cardi B the only female rapper to reach number one multiple times with solo songs, following "Bodak Yellow", and extended her record as the female rapper with the most number-one songs on the Hot 100 as her fifth chart-topper. Cardi B received a second nomination for the Brit Award for International Female Solo Artist.

Cardi B made a last-minute appearance in "Big Paper", from DJ Khaled's album Khaled Khaled released on April 30, 2021. Cardi received two nominations for the BET Award for Video of the Year, for the videos "Up" and "WAP", winning for the latter and becoming the first female rapper to win Video of the Year as a lead artist. This became the 10th time that an artist has had two nominated videos in this category as a lead artist, and the second time for her, following her nominations for "Money" and "Please Me" in 2019.

She announced her second pregnancy during the performance of her Migos collaboration "Type Shit" at the 2021 ceremony. She also appeared in F9, which was released on June 25, 2021, by Universal Pictures. On July 16, 2021, Cardi B was featured on the Normani single "Wild Side". Cardi collaborated with Lizzo on "Rumors", which debuted at number four on the Billboard Hot 100, becoming Cardi B's tenth top 10 single on the chart, and her seventh number-one on the Hot R&B/Hip-Hop Songs chart.

Cardi B received six nominations at the 2021 MTV Video Music Awards, including her second nomination for Video of the Year. She also led the nominations for the 2021 BET Hip Hop Awards along with Megan Thee Stallion, with nine each; both rappers won the most awards during the ceremony with three for "WAP", with Cardi becoming the first female artist to win Best Hip Hop Video twice (2019 and 2021).

On October 28, 2021, Cardi B previewed her sophomore album to Atlantic Records via her Instagram Story. She captioned "The money people liking the album sounds". On November 2, Cardi B was announced as the host of the 2021 American Music Awards (AMAs). The award show was held at the Microsoft Theater in Los Angeles on November 21, and marked the most social telecast of the year per interactions across social media. During the ceremony, "Up" won the award for Favorite Hip Hop Song, making Cardi B the first artist to win the category three times. Cardi B featured on Summer Walker's 2021 album Still Over It on the opening track "Bitter". Warner Records released the soundtrack for Halle Berry's directorial debut film Bruised on November 19. Selected by executive producers Berry and Cardi B, the Netflix film's soundtrack features six original songs by female artists, including Cardi, H.E.R., City Girls, Flo Milli, Saweetie, and Latto, and seven additional female rap songs inspired by the film.

In September 2022, Cardi B worked with rapper GloRilla on the official remix to her song "Tomorrow" titled "Tomorrow 2", the remix peaked at number 9 on the Billboard Hot 100, becoming Cardi's eleventh top 10 single on the chart.

Artistry

Influences
In Billboards "You Should Know" series, Cardi B said the first albums she ever purchased were by American entertainers Missy Elliott and Tweet, respectively. She has credited Puerto Rican rapper Ivy Queen and Jamaican dancehall artist Spice as influences, as well as Beyoncé, Lady Gaga, Lil' Kim, Madonna, and Selena. She has mentioned Chicago drill music as an important influence. When asked about the initial direction for her music, Cardi B said in an interview,  She also credits growing up in the South Bronx and real life experiences as influences for her songwriting; "I wouldn't be able to rap about the things that I rap about now [if I hadn't grown up there]."

Musical style
Her first studio album, Invasion of Privacy, is primarily a hip hop record, which comprises elements of trap, Latin music, and R&B. Consequence of Sound described her flow as "acrobatic and nimble." AllMusic editor David Jeffries called Cardi B "a raw and aggressive rapper". Stereogum called her voice "a full-bodied New Yawk nasal bleat, the sort of thing that you've heard if someone has ever told you that you stupid for taking too long at swiping your MetroCard." They continued to call her voice "an unabashedly loud and sexual fuck-you New York honk—that translates perfectly to rap."

In a 2017 Complex article about her, the editor wrote "unapologetic does not begin to describe the totally unfiltered and sheer Cardi B-ness of Cardi B's personality. She's a hood chick who's not afraid to be hood no matter the setting. Cardi B is Cardi B 24/7, 365, this is why she resonates with people, and that same energy comes out in her music." Her flow has been described as aggressive In 2019, NME described her lyrics as "sexually free" performed with "rapid" flow, and other publications have further described her lyrics as outspoken, while her punchlines have been praised, by such publications as Pitchfork and The Source, as clever and quotable. She possesses a New York-Dominican accent.

Cardi B has defended her musical content featuring sexually-charged lyrics—like most contemporary female rappers; she stated that the content "seems like that's what people want to hear", since she faced negative reactions after releasing her more emotional song, "Be Careful". She has declared, "[Drill music] is the type of artist I always wanted to be: I like to rap about the streets, and I like to rap about my pussy. I don't give a fuck about it." She has stated that writing and performing songs about her personal life and relationships initially caused her a "weird and uncomfortable" feeling and shyness.

Cardi B employs different vocal styles in her music; in "WAP" her vocal performance has been described as "throaty" and "staccato", while in "Up" she raps with alliteration, a tongue twister-run, and "some classically comedic Cardi" punch lines.

Other ventures
In February 2017, she partnered with M.A.C and Rio Uribe's Gypsy Sport for an event for New York Fashion Week. Her April appearance in i-Ds "A-Z of Music" video was sponsored by designer Marc Jacobs, and she made the cover of The Faders July/August 2017 Summer Music issue. Tom Ford's Cardi B-inspired lipstick, and named after her, was released in September 2018. It sold out within 24 hours. In November, she released a clothing line collection with Fashion Nova. The same month she partnered with Reebok, promoting the brand's Aztrek sneaker. In partnership with Reebok, she released a footwear and apparel collection in 2020, inspired by her personal style and paying homage to "classic 80s styling" and motifs. She released her second collection with Reebok in 2021, including sneakers, tracksuits and corsets, inspired by everyday life in New York City.

Cardi B teamed up with Pepsi for three television commercials, which aired during the Super Bowl LIII, the 61st Annual Grammy Awards, and Christmas. In early 2019, Cardi also joined other hip hop artists (including her husband Offset, as part of Migos) in releasing her flavors of snack food Rap Snacks: two flavors of chips, and two of popcorn. The bags' artwork were designed by Jai Manselle and inspired by the cover of Invasion of Privacy.

She premiered the series Cardi Tries via Facebook Messenger in December 2020, with herself as one of the executive producers.

In December 2021, Cardi B partnered with PLBY Group Inc. as creative director in residence for Playboy and founding member of Centerfold, a creator-driven website in the works. The partnership also includes fashion and sexual-wellness products. In collaboration with a company, she released a vodka-infused, vegan whipped cream "Whipshots" the same month.

Public image

Political statements
Cardi B identifies as a feminist. The rapper has been called "unabashedly, directly political" and often uses social media to advocate for causes she believes in, such as gun control. During the 2016 presidential primaries, she warned her fans of President Trump's immigration policies and encouraged them to vote for Senator Bernie Sanders. At the Grammy Awards in 2018, she appeared in a video along with Hillary Clinton to narrate a portion of Fire and Fury, Michael Wolff's insider's account of Trump's administration, and stated "Why am I even reading this shit? I can't believe this. I can't believe—this is how he really lives his life?"

Early in 2018 she used her social media to demand transparency on tax policy, asking for detailed information on how her taxpayer dollars are being spent in New York state and criticizing the maintenance of its streets, prisons, and public transportation. Cardi B endorsed Sanders once again in his second bid for the presidency in the 2020 United States presidential election, while praising U.S. Representative Tim Ryan. She stated that one of the reasons for her endorsement is Sanders' long-time involvement in supporting underprivileged minorities and "people getting Medicare because he knows they can't afford it," while Politico argued that she "might be one of Bernie's most powerful 2020 allies."

She has used her social pages to raise awareness for victims of police brutality, and has encouraged people to vote for mayors, judges and district attorneys in local elections. In a conversation with Democratic candidate Joe Biden for Elle, they discussed Medicare, free college tuition, and racial equality. According to a study published by The Hollywood Reporter, Cardi B ranked as the fifth most influential celebrity, and fourth among Generation Z, for the 2020 presidential election.

She has praised President Franklin D. Roosevelt for advocating for the Social Security program and the New Deal project. She said of President Roosevelt, "he helped us get over the Depression, all while he was in a wheelchair. Like, this man was suffering from polio at the time of his presidency, and yet all he was worried about was trying to make America great—make America great again for real. He's the real 'Make America Great Again,' because if it wasn't for him, old people wouldn't even get Social Security." Sanders has praised her for her "leading role" in calling attention to Social Security.

Fashion 

Cardi has a noted affinity for Christian Louboutin heels, a running theme in her song "Bodak Yellow". She has also mentioned her affinity for cheap, fast fashion brands stating "I don't care if it cost $20 or $15. If it looks good on me, it looks good on me". During an interview in early 2017, Cardi B spoke on being rejected by some fashion designers. Cardi wore vintage Thierry Mugler to the 2019 Grammy Awards, with an i-D article stating that the fashion house's "resurgence onto the fashion scene can almost single-handedly be attributed" to the Swarovski crystal-embroidered crinoline sheath gown she wore at the ceremony.

Mugler's collaboration with Cardi B marked the second time in 25 years that the Paris house opened its archives to dress a celebrity, the first being Beyoncé for her 2009 concert tour. W magazine credited the "WAP" music video for popularizing the Mugler bodysuit in the mainstream. Cardi has acknowledged Mugler as one of the first designers to "take a major chance on [her]" for their fashion collaborations.

Vogue, The Telegraph, Time, and Vibe have referred to her as a fashion icon. An article from Vogue noted she "is famous for her statement getups—whether she's rocking archival Mugler on the red carpet, or dripping in Chanel while sitting courtside at a basketball game." Her over-the-top manicures, designed by nail artist Jenny Bui and studded with Swarovski crystals, has become a part of her signature look. Editor Christian Allaire from the magazine in 2021 commented that her signature "bold" ensembles "create a spectacle" during fashion weeks.

In 2018, she became the first female rapper in the US to appear on the cover of Vogue magazine. Photographed by Annie Leibovitz, the cover, one of four for the January 2019 issue that included Stella McCartney, features her in a red and white Michael Kors dress and matching red Jimmy Choo shoes, while holding her daughter, Kulture.

In 2019, the Council of Fashion Designers of America included her on their list of "28 Black Fashion Forces". Vogue editor-in-chief Anna Wintour commended her fashion sense, declaring that she "completely rethought [her] opinion of Cardi B's style" after the 2019 Met Gala, where the rapper wore a Thom Browne-designed burgundy gown that extends outward in concentric circles for about ten feet and was inspired by the female form.

Cardi B became the face of Balenciaga's ad campaign for the winter 2020 season. The campaign includes billboards in several international locations, such as the Louvre museum. Vogues Brooke Bobb commented, "This is Cardi's first campaign for a luxury fashion house, though she's definitely no stranger to the Parisian style scene", citing her floral printed Richard Quinn ensemble "that literally covered her from head to toe" and her being "a front row fixture" at high fashion shows, adding, "She and her stylist Kollin Carter have been wildly successful in carving out a much-needed space for Cardi within the fashion industry, and they've cultivated a personal style that is all her own while being inspiring to all".

In 2020, Cardi B became the first female rapper to be awarded by the FN Achievement Awards when she won the Style Influencer of the Year award, which was presented to her by Christian Louboutin. In a press release for the awards show, she was called an "influence just about everything in pop culture—from music, fashion and style to social media, politics and even public service". In 2022, Rolling Stone ranked her as the second most-stylish woman in music, behind Lady Gaga, and GQ considered her "one of fashion's preeminent risk-takers."

Impact
Cardi B has been referred to as the "Reigning Queen of Hip Hop" by multiple publications, including Billboard, The Hollywood Reporter, Entertainment Weekly, Omaha World-Herald, Black Enterprise, Newsweek, and The A.V. Club, and as the "Queen of Rap" by NME, Essence, Harper's Bazaar Malaysia, The Jakarta Post, Uproxx, iHeartRadio, Geo TV, Vanity Fair, Joe, Boston Herald, Refinery 29, France 24, and Nigerian media The Guardian,  BBC News, and Daily Trust.

Spin staff credited her for opening "the table to a new generation of pop artists remaking American music in their own image and accents," as Cardi B "recognized that POC artists no longer need to pander or soften themselves in order to become household names." Billboard editors stated that with "Bodak Yellow"'s commercial success, "she left an indelible mark on the summer of 2017, not only because she rewrote history, but she gave hope to the have nots...". Several publications have credited "I Like It", the first Latin trap song to reach number one on the Hot 100, for introducing the "musical movement" to a mainstream, massive audience. Billboard Carl Lamarre considered "WAP"'s achievements "a clever Trojan horse for the myriad ways Cardi influences the culture with every move she makes."

The Wall Street Journals Neil Shah stated in 2020 that her breakthrough and success influenced "today's female-rap renaissance," while Genius staff credited her for "helping jumpstart a new wave of female hip-hop signings and promotion at labels," and NPR Music commented that the "renaissance" of the dynamism of women in rap grew "in enthusiasm and breadth" since Cardi's "first historic run" in 2017. Similarly, Clover Hope's book The Motherlode (2021) stated that Invasion of Privacy "jump-started a new era for women rappers in which success felt much more tangible" as Cardi B "multiplied the wealth of talent and resurrected the idea that numerous women who controlled their own stories could dominate rap at once."

The New Yorker has credited her for "changing a genre that has rarely allowed for more than one female superstar at a time." Uproxx noted Cardi B for promoting up-and-coming female rappers; "[she is] choosing to use her position at the height of stardom to open doors for other women to flourish in hip-hop at a greater level than any since the Golden Era and 'Ladies First'," considering it "something of a departure from tradition; for the decade previous to Cardi's precipitous come-up, it seemed hip-hop had an unspoken, Highlander-esque rule in place regarding women." Variety deemed her a "hip-hop icon", and The Independent called her "the people's pop culture icon", writing that she "has become one of the most recognisable cultural figures of the past 10 years".

NPR defined "Cardi B effect" as "a branding power rooted in specific authenticity, created and permeated by rapper Cardi B" and noticed that with her breakthrough, "brands finally started to become hip to [her] effect, noticing the cultural markers outside of the rap world that were proving it wasn't limited to clubs, concerts and radio." Business magazine Inc. stated that her success "shows how social media changed everything we knew about traditional marketing and media", which no longer relies on a "well-thought marketing scheme or millions of dollars in advertising." In 2019, a life-sized sculpture of her was on display at the Brooklyn Museum, as part of Spotify's RapCaviar "Pantheon".

Bloomberg reported that her data bill helped to boost Ghana's GDP growth in 2019, after it was part of a concert tour. She inspired the creation of the sitcom Partners in Rhyme, executively produced by MC Lyte about a young woman in high school who "aspires to be the next Cardi B." P-Valley creator and executive producer Katori Hall cited her an inspiration for the TV series, and credited her for "helping prepare the public" for its storyline.

Several artists have cited Cardi B's work as an inspiration, including Rosalía, Olivia Rodrigo, Jazmine Sullivan, Selena Gomez, Blackpink, Spice, Greta Gerwig, Nathy Peluso, Rubi Rose, María Becerra, and Abigail Asante. Cardi B has been credited for supporting and uniting female rappers in the industry, with a writer from Uproxx considering her co-sign "the new Drake effect" for women in hip hop.

Achievements

Cardi B is the recipient of numerous accolades, including a Grammy Award, eight Billboard Music Awards (including three consecutive Top Rap Female Artist wins), six Guinness World Records, six American Music Awards, four MTV Video Music Awards, six BET Awards (including Album of the Year), and fourteen BET Hip Hop Awards. Invasion of Privacy—which made her the first female rapper to win the Grammy Award for Best Rap Album as a solo artist—became the first female rap album in fifteen years to be nominated for a Grammy Award for Album of the Year.

Time included her on their annual list of the 100 most influential people in the world in 2018. She received the ASCAP award for Songwriter of the Year in 2019, becoming the first female rapper to win the award. She received the honor for the second time in 2020, making her the first female songwriter to win the award twice. In 2020, Cardi B became the first female rapper to be named Woman of the Year at the Billboard Women in Music Awards.

Cardi B is the female rapper with the most Billboard Hot 100 number one singles (5) and the one with the most total weeks on the top position (16). "I Like It" became the first song led by a female rapper to surpass a billion streams on Spotify, making her the first woman in hip hop with multiple billion-streamers on the service, with a total of three so far. With the singles "Taki Taki" and "WAP" she became the only female rapper to top the global Spotify chart multiple times. Since August 2020, "WAP" holds the record of the biggest first-week streams for a song in the United States. Invasion of Privacy was the top female rap album of the 2010s, according to the Billboard 200 decade-end chart. It became the longest-charting album by a female rapper on the Billboard 200, and the most-streamed female rap album on Spotify.

Cardi is the female rapper with the most Diamond-certified songs by the Recording Industry Association of America (RIAA) (3): "Bodak Yellow", which made her the first female rapper to have a song certified Diamond; "Girls Like You", which made her the only female rapper to achieve multiple Diamond-certified songs; and "I Like It", a tie for the most among women artists. Cardi B has topped twice Pitchforks annual list of best songs of the year (2017 and 2020). Billboard staff and Rolling Stone ranked her debut album number 13 and 34 on their critics' lists of the best albums of the 2010s respectively, both the highest rank for a female rapper for the decade. Cardi B has become the highest-certified female rapper of all time on the RIAA's Top Artists (Digital Singles) ranking, with 54 million certified units, also being among the highest-certified female artists overall. In October, 2022, five years after her major-label debut, she reached 100 million units sold in RIAA certifications, across her album, singles and guest appearances.

In the US, Cardi has achieved three times the best-performing song of the year by a female artist—the first act to do so this century—in 2017, 2018, and 2020. As of 2021, "I Like It" is the most-streamed song by a female rapper in the United Kingdom. In August 2021, "Bodak Yellow" made Cardi B the only female rapper to have two videos on her YouTube channel with more than 1 billion views, joining "I Like It", and became the fastest solo female rap song to reach that mark on the platform. Cardi is the only female rapper ranked on Billboards Greatest Hot 100 Hits of All Time, with "Girls Like You" at number 30.

Personal life
Cardi B is a practicing Catholic. She identifies as bisexual. In connection with the Me Too movement, she has discussed being sexually assaulted in the past.

Cardi B's younger sister, Hennessy Carolina, also has a strong following on social media and has accompanied her to award shows, such as the 2018 Grammy Awards.

In a 2018 interview, Cardi B talked about being Afro-Latina and Afro-Caribbean:

Relationships
As of early 2017, Cardi B began dating fellow rapper Offset. They became engaged on October 27, 2017. On April 7, 2018, during her second performance on Saturday Night Live, Cardi B revealed her pregnancy; she was about six months (24 weeks) pregnant at the time. On June 25, 2018, TMZ found a marriage license revealing Cardi B and Offset had actually secretly married in September 2017, one month before the public proposal. She later confirmed this in a social media post.

Cardi B gave birth to her daughter on July 10, 2018. In December 2018, she announced on Instagram that she and Offset had separated, though the pair later reunited. In February 2019, the couple made a public appearance for the Grammys. He accompanied her onstage during her acceptance speech for Best Rap Album.

In September 2020, it was reported that Cardi B had filed for divorce from Offset, but the following month it was revealed they were back together. In June 2021, Cardi B revealed she was pregnant with her second child, a boy. She gave birth to her son on September 4, 2021. On the fifth anniversary of her marriage, Cardi B announced she is planning her official wedding.

Legal issues
On October 1, 2018, Cardi B agreed to meet with investigators at a Queens police station in connection with an alleged assault of two female bartenders. The victims claimed that Cardi B and her entourage "threw bottles and alcohol at them." She denied involvement. She was charged with two misdemeanors: assault and reckless endangerment. Cardi B appeared in court for her arraignment on December 7, 2018, after she did not show up for the originally scheduled date due to a scheduling conflict, according to her attorney. On June 21, 2019, a jury indicted Cardi B on 14 charges, including two counts of felony assault with intent to cause serious physical injury, stemming from the incident. She was arraigned on June 25, 2019, and pleaded not guilty on all charges. On September 15, 2022, she plead guilty to third-degree assault and second-degree reckless endangerment, resulting in a sentence of 15 days of community service.

On January 24, 2022,  Cardi won a million-dollar defamation verdict against YouTuber Latasha Kebe (Tasha K) for waging a "malicious campaign" to hurt her reputation by posting false rumors. The jury issued a verdict that Cardi B had been defamed and awarded $1.25 million in damages. Further proceedings brought the total fine against Kebe to $3.82 million.

On March 25, 2022, Cardi, her sister Hennessy, and Hennessy's girlfriend won a defamation lawsuit filed against them by three men over an incident at a Suffolk County beach.

Philanthropy
On September 13, 2022, Cardi surprised her old elementary school, I.S. 232 in the Bronx, and announced that she would be donating $100,000 to the institution.

Controversies

Cardi B sparked controversy after throwing one of her high heel shoes at and attempting to physically attack fellow rapper Nicki Minaj at a New York Fashion Week after-party in September 2018. Following the altercation, she alleged that Minaj had previously "liked" social media comments that spoke negatively of Cardi B's ability to take care of her newborn daughter. Minaj denied the allegations, and accused Cardi B of cyberbullying in a heated Instagram exchange from 2014. Cardi B was on the cover of the 2019 spring fashion issue of Harper's Bazaar, which featured her in a Cinderella-themed photo shoot wearing a red gown and leaving a shoe behind. Some interpreted this as a reference to the incident.

After the release of "Girls" in May 2018, a collaboration where she had a featured verse, Cardi B responded to accusations of the song trivializing and sexualizing LGBT relationships; she tweeted, "We never try to cause harm or had bad intentions with the song." She went on to add, "I personally myself had experiences with other women."

In March 2019, an Instagram livestream from 2016 resurfaced where Cardi B can be heard claiming that in the past she "had drugged and robbed men" who willingly came with her to hotel rooms for sexual intercourse. When video of the livestream resurfaced, she stated that the men she referred to were conscious, willing and aware; they were getting "twisted in the club" before approaching her, and denied ever putting anything in a man's drink. She added that she took some money from them because they wasted her time by falling asleep, and then "kept coming back." She concluded by saying that at that time she had very limited options to survive, and feels a responsibility not to glorify it.

Discography

Invasion of Privacy (2018)

Filmography

See also

 Afro-Caribbean music
 Black Hispanic and Latino Americans
 LGBT culture in New York City
 List of self-identifying LGBTQ New Yorkers
List of highest-certified music artists in the United States
List of artists who reached number one in the United States
 Dominican Americans
 Hispanics and Latinos in New York
 List of most-followed Instagram accounts

References

Further reading

External links

 
 
 
 
 

 
1992 births
Living people
21st-century American actresses
21st-century American rappers
21st-century American women writers
21st-century women rappers
Actresses from New York City
American erotic dancers
American female erotic dancers
American women hip hop musicians
American women rappers
American women songwriters
American feminists
American Internet celebrities
American people of Caribbean descent
American rappers of Dominican Republic descent
American rappers of Trinidad and Tobago descent
American television actresses
American women television personalities
American LGBT songwriters
Atlantic Records artists
Bloods
Catholics from New Jersey
Catholics from New York (state)
Dancers from New York (state)
East Coast hip hop musicians
Feminist musicians
Gangsta rappers
Grammy Award winners for rap music
Hip hop models
Hispanic and Latino American actresses
Hispanic and Latino American rappers
American people of Spanish descent
MTV Europe Music Award winners
Participants in American reality television series
People from Edgewater, New Jersey
Quality Control artists
Rappers from the Bronx
Shorty Award winners
Songwriters from New York (state)
Sony Music Publishing artists
Spanish-language singers of the United States
Trap musicians
African-American songwriters
Television producers from New Jersey
LGBT rappers
LGBT Hispanic and Latino American people
Bisexual women
Bisexual actresses
Bisexual entertainers
Bisexual songwriters
LGBT Roman Catholics
American people convicted of assault
Sex-positive feminists
American bisexual writers